L'anima vola is the eighth studio album by Italian singer–songwriter Elisa. It was released on 15 October 2013 in Italy.

Track listing
All lyrics written by Elisa except where noted; all music composed by Elisa except where noted.

Musicians
Elisa - vocals, guitar, acoustic guitar, piano, keyboards, electric guitar, bass, programming
Andrea Rigonat - guitar, acoustic guitar, electric guitar
Christian "Noochie" Rigano - keyboards, synth, piano, organ, programming
Sean Hurley - bass
Davide Rossi - violin, programming
Victor Indrizzo - drums, percussions

Chart performance

References

Elisa (Italian singer) albums
2013 albums